32 Tauri is the Flamsteed designation for a solitary star in the zodiac constellation of Taurus. It has a visual magnitude of 5.64, making it visible to the naked eye from suburban skies (according to the Bortle scale). The position of this star near the ecliptic plane means that it is subject to occultations by the Moon. Parallax measurements put it at a distance of 144 light years from the Sun. It is drifting further away with a radial velocity of +31.9 km/s, having come to within  some 759,000 years ago.

The spectrum of this star matches a stellar classification of F2IVs, with the luminosity class of IV indicating that this star has reached the subgiant stage and is in the process of evolving into a giant star. It has twice the mass of the sun with nearly three times the Sun's radius, but 15 times the Sun's luminosity and about half the Sun's age. The abundance of elements other than hydrogen and helium is lower in this star than in the Sun.

References

F-type subgiants
Taurus (constellation)
Tauri, 032
1218
BD+22 0605
024740
018471